Rothley is a village in Leicestershire, England.

Rothley may also refer to:

 Rothley, Northumberland, England
 Rothley railway station, Leicestershire, England
 Rothley Imperial F.C., Leicestershire, England
 Willi Rothley, a German politician